Anthony Fergus Ker (born 1967) is a chess International Master (IM).

Chess career
Ker has represented New Zealand in eight Chess Olympiads between 1988 and 2018. His best result was in 1988 when he scored 7.5/12.

Ker has won or jointly won the New Zealand Chess Championship fourteen times since 1988/89.

Anthony Ker was awarded the IM title when he finished third, with 6/9, in the Oceania Zonal Chess Championship held in Auckland, New Zealand in May 2000. He also competed in the Oceania Chess Championships in 2002, 2005 and 2012.

Ker has had a decades-long friendly rivalry with fellow IM and NZ Champion Russell Dive, with an almost level score and high number of decisive games.

Bridge
Ker is also a strong bridge player who has represented New Zealand at several international events.

Notable games
 Anthony Ker vs Boris Spassky, Wellington Plaza 1988, King's Indian Defense: Saemisch Variation, (E83), 1/2-1/2
 Anthony Ker vs Edhi Handoko, South East Asian Zonal 1995, Slav Defense: Exchange Variation, (D10), 1-0

References

External links 
 
 
 
 
 

1967 births
Living people
Chess International Masters
New Zealand chess players
Chess Olympiad competitors
New Zealand contract bridge players
People from Wellington City